The anniversary of the Iranian Revolution is celebrated on 22 Bahman, which is the 11th month in the Iranian calendar, equivalent to 11 February in the Gregorian calendar. It commemorates the protests that led to the downfall of the Pahlavi dynasty and the installation of the Islamic Revolutionary which is headed by Imam Khomeini. This political celebration is held on the last day of the celebration called the Ten Days of fajr.

Background

Ayatollah Ruhollah Khomeini, founder of the Islamic Republic, entered Tehran on 1 February 1979 and led an uprising throughout in Iran that resulted in victory after 10 days.
 
The Iranian Revolution on 11 February 1979 was caused by the participation of different groups of people. The Pahlavi dynasty officially ended and finally, conditions were prepared to forming the Islamic Republic led by the cleric, Ayatollah Ruhollah Khomeini. Islamic thoughts and characters had a significant role in the anti monarchic revolution and Khomeini called it as revolution.

Original event

On 11 February 1979, after the victory of Iranian revolution hundreds of military personnel and policemen marched toward Azadi Tower. 

One of their demands was a lack of dependence on the United States and the Soviet Union as dominant powers of that time.

Gallery

See also
 Timeline of the Iranian Revolution
 Fajr decade

References

Iranian Revolution
February observances
Public holidays in Iran
Winter events in Iran
Observances set by the Solar Hijri calendar
Politics of Iran